Gushee is a community in Savelugu-Nanton District in the Northern Region of Ghana. It is a less populated community with nucleated settlement. People in the community are predominantly farmers.

See also
Suburbs of Savelugu-Nanton(Ghana) District

References 

Communities in Ghana